Alastair S. Robinson (born 1980) is a taxonomist and field botanist specialising in the carnivorous plant genus Nepenthes, for which he is regarded as a world authority. He is currently Manager Biodiversity Services at the National Herbarium of Victoria, Royal Botanic Gardens Melbourne, where he oversees identification botany services, the Library and Artwork components of the State Botanical Collection, and the botanical journal Muelleria, a peer-reviewed scientific journal on botany published by the Royal Botanic Gardens Victoria, for which he is Editor in Chief.

In 2007, Robinson co-discovered the giant Palawan pitcher plant, Nepenthes attenboroughii, for which he published the formal description and diagnosis in 2009, speculating on the paleogeographical evidence for the radiative speciation of an enigmatic group of ultramafic Philippine and Malaysian Nepenthes from a common ancestor on the island of Borneo. Nepenthes attenboroughii was the largest pitcher Nepenthes discovered since the identification of Nepenthes rajah on Borneo in 1858. Other discoveries resulting from his work in Palawan include a first record of the orchid genus Stigmatodactylus in the Philippines, with two new species, Stigmatodactylus aquamarinus A.S.Rob. & E.Gironella and Stigmatodactylus dalagangpalawanicum A.S.Rob., described from Palawan in 2016.

A slipper orchid endemic to Sulawesi, Indonesia, was commemoratively named Paphiopedilum robinsonianum after this authority following its discovery in 2013.

Robinson received his BSc from University College London and his PhD from the University of Cambridge for research into the molecular control mechanisms of spatio-temporal cell-development in plants. Specialisms also include stapeliads (Apocynaceae), terrestrial orchids, ecology and conservation biology.

Works of interest include a 3-volume flora of the genus Drosera (2017), a 2-volume flora of the genus Pinguicula (2016), a 2-volume flora of Nepenthes, titled Pitcher Plants of the Old World (2009), for which he co-authored the species descriptions, and a range of Nepenthes field guides.

Robinson is brother to screen actress Zuleikha Robinson.

Standard author abbreviation

Selected published taxa
 Nepenthes attenboroughii A.S.Rob., S.McPherson & V.B.Heinrich
 Stigmatodactylus dalagangpalawanicum A.S.Rob.

Australian Plant Name Index

International Plant Names Index

See also :Category:Taxa named by Alastair Robinson

Publications
 Robinson, A.S., Zamudio, S.G. and Caballero, R.B. (2019). Nepenthes erucoides (Nepenthaceae), an ultramaficolous micro-endemic from Dinagat Islands Province, northern Mindanao, Philippines. Phytotaxa 423 (1), 21–32. 
 Robinson, A.S., Golos, M.R., Barer, M., Sano, Y., Forgie, J.J., Garrido, D., Gorman, C.N., Luick, A.O., McIntosh, N.W., McPherson, S.R., Palena, G.J., Panco, I., Quinn, B.R., and Shea, J. (2019). Revisions in Nepenthes following explorations of the Kemul Massif and the surrounding region in north-central Kalimantan, Borneo. Phytotaxa, 392(2), 97–126. 
 Robinson A.S., Cross A.T., Meisterl M.E. & Fleischmann A., 2018. A new pygmy sundew, Drosera albonotata (Droseraceae), from the western Wheatbelt and an updated diagnostic key to the orange-flowered pygmy Drosera of Western Australia. Phytotaxa, 346(3), pp.221-236. 
 Clarke, C., Schlauer, J., Moran, J. & Robinson, A.S., 2018. Systematics and evolution of Nepenthes. In: Ellison, A.M. & Adamec, L., eds.: Carnivorous plants: physiology, ecology, and evolution. Oxford University Press, 58–69. 
 Robinson A.S. (2017). Drosera banksii R.Br. ex DC. Philippines Distribution Extension. In: Robinson A.S., Gibson R., Gonella P., McPherson S.R., Nunn R. & Fleischmann A.: Drosera of the World. Vol. 3 - Latin America & Africa. Redfern Natural History, UK, pp 1540–1541.
 Lowrie A., Nunn R., Robinson A.S., Bourke G., McPherson S. & Fleischmann A. (2017). Drosera of the World. Vol. 1, Oceania. Redfern Natural History, Dorset. 536 pp.
 Lowrie A., Robinson A.S., Nunn R., Rice B., Bourke G., Gibson R., McPherson S. & Fleischmann A. (2017). Drosera of the World. Vol. 2, Oceania, Asia, Europe, North America. Redfern Natural History, Dorset. 554 pp.
 Robinson A.S., Gibson R., Gonella P., McPherson S., Nunn R. & Fleischmann A. (2017). Drosera of the World. Vol. 3, Latin America & Africa. Redfern Natural History, Dorset. 476 pp.
 Robinson A.S., Gironella E., & Cervancia J. (2016). New orchid species of Stigmatodactylus (Orchidoideae; Diurideae) and a new record of Cryptostylis carinata from central Palawan, Philippines. Phytotaxa, 252(2), 99–113. 
 Roccia A., Gluch O., Lampard S., Robinson A.S., Fleischmann A., McPherson S., Legendre L., Partrat E., Temple P. (2016). Pinguicula of the Temperate North. Redfern Natural History, UK, 349 pp.
 Lampard S., Gluch O., Robinson A.S., Fleischmann A., Temple P., McPherson S., Roccia A., Partrat E., Legendre L. (2016). Pinguicula of Latin America. Redfern Natural History, UK, 362 pp.
 Lowrie, A. 2014. (editor, contributor) Carnivorous Plants of Australia Magnum Opus Volume 1. Redfern Natural History Productions, UK.
 McPherson, S., A.S. Robinson, 2012. Field Guide to the Pitcher Plants of Australia and New Guinea. Redfern Natural History Productions, UK.
 McPherson, S., A.S. Robinson, 2012. Field Guide to the Pitcher Plants of Peninsular Malaysia and Indochina. Redfern Natural History Productions, UK.
 McPherson, S., A.S. Robinson, 2012. Field Guide to the Pitcher Plants of Sumatra and Java. Redfern Natural History Productions, UK.
 McPherson, S., A.S. Robinson, 2012. Field Guide to the Pitcher Plants of Borneo. Redfern Natural History Productions, UK.
 McPherson, S., A.S. Robinson, 2012. Field Guide to the Pitcher Plants of Sulawesi. Redfern Natural History Productions, UK.
 Robinson, A.S., J. Nerz, A. Wistuba, M. Mansur & S. McPherson, 2011. Nepenthes lamii Jebb & Cheek, an emended description resulting from the separation of a two-species complex, and the introduction of Nepenthes monticola, a new species of highland Nepenthes from New Guinea. In: S.R. McPherson New Nepenthes: Volume One. Redfern Natural History Productions, Poole. pp. 477–512.
 Robinson, A.S., J. Nerz, & A. Wistuba, 2011. Nepenthes epiphytica, a new Pitcher Plant from East Kalimantan. In: S.R. McPherson New Nepenthes: Volume One. Redfern Natural History Productions, Poole. pp. 316–331.
 Mey, F.S., L.H. Truong, D.V. Dai & A.S. Robinson, 2011. Nepenthes thorelii, an emended description and novel ecological data resulting from its rediscovery in Tay Ninh, Vietnam. In: S.R. McPherson New Nepenthes: Volume One. Redfern Natural History Productions, Poole. pp. 437–465.
 McPherson, S., G. Bourke, J. Cervancia, M. Jaunzems, E. Gironella, A. Robinson & A. Fleischmann 2011. Nepenthes leonardoi (Nepenthaceae), a new pitcher plant species from Palawan, Philippines. Carniflora Australis 8(1): 4–19.
 Fleischmann, A., A.S. Robinson, S. McPherson, V. Heinrich, E. Gironella & D.A. Madulid 2011.  Blumea 56(1): 10–15.
 McPherson, S.R., Fleischmann, A.S., Robinson, A.S., 2010. Carnivorous Plants and their Habitats Volume 1. Redfern Natural History Productions, UK, 723 pages.
 McPherson, S.R., Fleischmann, A.S., Robinson, A.S., 2010. Carnivorous Plants and their Habitats Volume 2. Redfern Natural History Productions, UK, 719 pages.
 Mey, F.S., M. Catalano, C. Clarke, A. Robinson, A. Fleischmann & S. McPherson 2010.  In: S.R. McPherson Carnivorous Plants and their Habitats. Volume 2. Redfern Natural History Productions, Poole. pp. 1306–1331.
 McPherson, S., J. Cervancia, C. Lee, M. Jaunzems, A. Fleischmann, F. Mey, E. Gironella & A. Robinson, 2010. Nepenthes palawanensis (Nepenthaceae), a new pitcher plant species from Sultan Peak, Palawan Island, Philippines. In: S.R. McPherson Carnivorous Plants and their Habitats. Redfern Natural History Productions Ltd., Poole. pp. 1332–1339.
 McPherson, S., J. Cervancia, C. Lee, M. Jaunzems, A. Fleischmann, F. Mey, E. Gironella & A. Robinson, 2010. Nepenthes gantungensis (Nepenthaceae), a new pitcher plant species from Mount Gantung, Palawan, Philippines. In: S.R. McPherson Carnivorous Plants and their Habitats. Redfern Natural History Productions Ltd., Poole. pp. 1286–1295.
 Robinson, AS, et al., 2009. A spectacular new species of Nepenthes L. (Nepenthaceae) pitcher plant from central Palawan, Philippines. Bot. J. Linn. Soc. 159(2): 195–202.
 McPherson, SR, Robinson, AS, Fleischmann, AS, 2009. Pitcher Plants of the Old World Volume 1. Redfern Natural History Productions, UK, 630 pages.
 McPherson, SR, Robinson, AS, Fleischmann, AS, 2009. Pitcher Plants of the Old World Volume 2. Redfern Natural History Productions, UK, 766 pages.
 de Jager, SM, Scofield, S, Huntley, RP, Robinson, AS, et al., 2009. Dissecting regulatory pathways of G1/S control in Arabidopsis: common and distinct targets of CYCD3;1, E2Fa and E2Fc. Plant Molecular Biology. 71(4–5): 345–365.
 Robinson, A. 1997. Malaysia Trip 1996. The Carnivorous Plant Society Journal 20: 6–17.
 Robinson, A. 1995 ['1994/95']. Plant findings in Malaysia. The Carnivorous Plant Society Journal 18: 44–47.

References

External links
 

British botanists
British taxonomists
Alumni of Queens' College, Cambridge
Alumni of University College London
People educated at Harrow School
1980 births
Living people
American people of Anglo-Burmese descent
British people of Malaysian descent
British people of Indian descent
Anglo-Indian people
Anglo-Burmese people
English people of Malaysian descent
Malaysian people of Indian descent
Botanical collectors active in Australia
Muelleria (journal) editors